Shahbaz Khan may refer to:

 Shahbaz Khan (actor), formerly Haider Amir, Indian actor
 Shahbaz Khan (colonel), Pakistan Army colonel
 Shahbaz Khan (cricketer) (born 1991), Pakistani cricketer
 Shahbaz Khan (hydrologist), Australian climatologist and hydrologist
 Shahbaz Khan Bugti, Baloch tribal chief
 Shahbaz Khan Kamboh (1529–1599), Mughal general of Akbar

See also